The 1994 Croatian Football Super Cup was the third edition of the Croatian Football Super Cup, a two-legged affair contested between 1993–94 Croatian First League winners Hajduk Split and 1993–94 Croatian Football Cup winners Croatia Zagreb.

The first leg was played at Stadion Poljud in Split on 24 July 1994, while the second leg on 31 July 1994 at Stadion Maksimir in Zagreb.

First leg

Second leg

References 
 1994 Croatian Football Super Cup at HRnogomet.com

1994
HNK Hajduk Split matches
GNK Dinamo Zagreb matches
Supercup
Association football penalty shoot-outs